Gynoxys cuicochensis is a species of flowering plant in the family Asteraceae. It is found only in Ecuador. Its natural habitat is subtropical or tropical moist montane forests. It is threatened by habitat loss.

References

cuicochensis
Flora of Ecuador
Near threatened plants
Taxonomy articles created by Polbot